Debra Anderson is a Canadian writer, who won the 2009 Dayne Ogilvie Prize from the Writers' Trust of Canada for an emerging lesbian, gay, bisexual or transgender writer.

A graduate of the creative writing program at York University, her publications to date include the novel Code White (2005) and the play Withholding. Her work has also been anthologized in Bent on Writing: Contemporary Queer Tales (2002), Brazen Femme: Queering Femininity (2002), Geeks, Misfits and Outlaws (2003) and Persistence: All Ways Butch and Femme (2011). Her writing has also been published by periodicals including Fireweed, Xtra!, The Church-Wellesley Review, Tessera, Shameless, periwinkle, Zygote, Acta Victoriana, Hook & Ladder, dig and Siren.

While at York University, she won the institution's George Ryga Award, a prize for the best play written by a student in the university's playwrighting courses. She has also written and released a short animated film, Don't Touch Me, which premiered at the Inside Out Film and Video Festival in 1998.

Anderson is also the organizer of Get Your Lit Out, a reading series in Toronto that promotes local women writers.

References

External links
Debra Anderson

Canadian women novelists
Canadian women dramatists and playwrights
Canadian lesbian writers
Writers from Toronto
Living people
York University alumni
21st-century Canadian novelists
Lesbian dramatists and playwrights
Lesbian novelists
Canadian LGBT novelists
Canadian LGBT dramatists and playwrights
21st-century Canadian dramatists and playwrights
21st-century Canadian women writers
Year of birth missing (living people)
21st-century Canadian LGBT people